Sedbergh railway station was located in the West Riding of Yorkshire, serving the town and locale of Sedbergh on the Ingleton Branch Line. The town now lies in Cumbria following boundary changes in 1974.

History
The Lancaster and Carlisle Railway built the Ingleton Branch Line from the existing Ingleton Station to Low Gill. By the time the branch was completed in 1861, the L&CR was operated by the London and North Western Railway (L&NWR).

After formal closure to passenger traffic in February 1954, the line was still on occasions used for weekend excursions and to transport pupils to and from local boarding schools (including one in the town here). Goods traffic continued until 1 October 1964. The line was maintained as a possible relief route until April 1967 when the tracks were lifted.

Current state
The station building is now in private hands although its building are largely unchanged.

Part of the site is used as a coal yard and the goods shed remains.

References

Notes

Sources

 Butt, R.V.J. (1995). The Directory Of Railway Stations. Patrick Stephens Limited. .
 Western, Robert (1990). The Ingleton Branch. Oxford : Oakwood Press.

External links
 Sedbergh station
 Old Cumbria Gazetteer - Sedbergh Station
 Old Cumbria Gazetteer - Sedbergh Goods Yard
 Lune valley Railway

Disused railway stations in Cumbria
Railway stations in Great Britain opened in 1861
Railway stations in Great Britain closed in 1954
Former Lancaster and Carlisle Railway stations
Sedbergh
1861 establishments in England